Aboubakr Seddik Lbida (born 26 January 1980 in Hay Hassani) is a Moroccan boxer. At the 2012 Summer Olympics, he competed in the Men's bantamweight, but was defeated in the first round by Ibrahim Balla of Australia.

References

1980 births
Living people
Olympic boxers of Morocco
Boxers at the 2012 Summer Olympics
Bantamweight boxers
Moroccan male boxers
Mediterranean Games bronze medalists for Morocco
Mediterranean Games medalists in boxing
Competitors at the 2005 Mediterranean Games
Competitors at the 2013 Mediterranean Games
20th-century Moroccan people
21st-century Moroccan people